Frédéric Pierrot (born 17 September 1960) is a French actor. He has appeared in more than 120 films and television shows since 1986. He starred in the film Tell Me I'm Dreaming, which was screened in the Un Certain Regard section at the 1998 Cannes Film Festival. He was also in Abner Pastoll's 2015 film Road Games.

Theater

Filmography

References

External links

1960 births
Living people
French male film actors
Male actors from Paris
20th-century French male actors
People from Boulogne-Billancourt
21st-century French male actors
French male stage actors
Chevaliers of the Ordre des Arts et des Lettres